Müberra Sibel Kizavul (born January 10, 1993) is a retired national level Turkish volleyball player, who last played for Maltepe Yalı Spor.

Club
Kizavul began playing volleyball in the infrastructure of Eczacıbaşı VitrA in 2000, and played in the youth and senior teams. She played five matches at the 2011–12 Women's CEV Cup with Eczacıbaşı VitrA.

In 2012, she transferred to Sarıyer Belediyespor, which became champion at the end of the 2011–12 season in the Turkish Women's Volleyball Second League and was promoted to the Turkish Women's Volleyball League.

In May 2014, she underwent a surgery on her knee needing six months of rehabilitation.

International
In 2008, Kızavul was admitted to the Turkey girls' youth national volleyball team, and participated at the 2009 Girls' Youth European Volleyball Championship. In 2009, she was again a member of the girls' youth team.

Awards

Clubs
 Turkish Girls' Championship (2006, 2007)-  Gold Medal
 Turkish Cadet Girls' Championship (2006, 2007, 2008)-  Gold Medal
 Turkish Secondary Schools Championship (2006, 2007)-  Gold Medal
 Turkish High Schools Championship (2008, 2009)-  Silver Medal
 Turkish High Schools Championship (2011)-  Gold Medal
 Turkish Junior Women's Championship (2009)-  Gold Medal
 Turkish Junior Women's League (2009, 2010, 2011)-  Gold Medal
 Turkish Women's Second League (2011–12)-  Gold Medal

International
 Balkan Cadets Championship (2008)-  Gold Medal
 Balkan Cadets Championship (2009)-  Silver Medal

References

Living people
1993 births
Volleyball players from Istanbul
Turkish women's volleyball players
Eczacıbaşı volleyball players
Turkey women's international volleyball players
21st-century Turkish women